Pittosporaceae is a family of flowering plants that consists of 200–240 species of trees, shrubs, and lianas in 9 genera. Habitats range from tropical to temperate climates of the Afrotropical, Indomalayan, Oceanian, and Australasian realms. The type genus is Pittosporum Banks ex Gaertn.

Description
Pittosporaceae are dioecious trees, shrubs, or twining vines, with leaves having pinnate venation, no stipules, and margins that are smooth. Ovaries are superior, often with parietal placentation. The style is undivided and straight, and the stigma is often lobed. The fruit is a capsule or berry with the calyx being shed from the fruit. The seeds are surrounded by sticky pulp that comes from secretions of the placental hairs. The flowers have equal numbers of sepals, petals and stamens.

Genera
, the following nine genera are placed within this family as accepted by Plants of the World Online:

 Auranticarpa L.W.Cayzer, Crisp & I.Telford
 Bentleya E.M.Benn.
 Billardiera Sm.
 Bursaria Cav.
 Cheiranthera A.Cunn. ex Lindl.
 Hymenosporum R.Br. ex F.Muell. (H. flavum being the sole species)
 Marianthus Hügel
 Pittosporum Banks ex Gaertn.
 Rhytidosporum F.Muell.

References

External links

 Family Pittosporaceae on the  APWebsite (chapter description and systematics)

 
Asterid families
Taxa named by Robert Brown (botanist, born 1773)